The Superior Court is North Carolina's general jurisdiction trial court. It was established in 1777 and is North Carolina's oldest court.

Jurisdiction and administration
The  Superior Court is the trial court of general jurisdiction in North Carolina. It hears all felony cases and certain misdemeanor cases. In civil matters, superior courts have original jurisdiction over civil disputes with an amount in controversy exceeding $25,000. (This amount was formerly $10,000, but this  jurisdictional amount was increased effective August 1, 2013). The superior court also adjudicates appeals from administrative agencies, and appeals of misdemeanor cases from the North Carolina District Courts.

The Superior Courts are divided into 8 divisions and further into 50 districts. There are 97 regular Superior Court judges under current state law, in addition to "special judges" who are appointed by the Governor, not elected.

Judges rotate from district to district within their division every six months in order to avoid the danger of corruption or favoritism.

History
The Superior Court is the state's oldest court, having been established in 1777. The first three judges elected by the North Carolina General Assembly were Samuel Ashe of New Hanover County, Samuel Spencer of Anson County, and future U.S. Supreme Court Justice James Iredell of Chowan County. Until the creation of a separate North Carolina Supreme Court in 1818, Superior Court judges sitting together functioned as the state's only appellate court.

See also
Courts of North Carolina

References

References
 

North Carolina state courts
North Carolina
1777 in North Carolina
Courts and tribunals established in 1777